Cladosporium musae is a fungal plant pathogen that causes Cladosporium speckle on banana and which occurs in most countries in which the fruit is cultivated. Unsuccessful attempts to transfer the Cladosporium pathogen in vitro to healthy banana plants seem to confirm reports that the infection remains latent in otherwise healthy plants.

References

External links 
 Index Fungorum
 USDA ARS Fungal Database

Fungal plant pathogens and diseases
Banana diseases
Cladosporium
Fungi described in 1945